The 2016 World Outdoor Bowls Championship men's fours  was held at the Burnside Bowling Club in Avonhead, Christchurch, New Zealand from 6–11 December 2016.

The men's fours gold medal was won by Blake Signal, Mike Kernaghan, Mike Nagy and Ali Forsyth of New Zealand.

Section tables

Section 1

Section 2

Finals

Results

References

Men